Daniel Renouf (born June 1, 1994) is a Canadian professional ice hockey defenceman for the Providence Bruins of the American Hockey League (AHL) while under contract to the Boston Bruins of the National Hockey League (NHL).

Playing career

Junior 
Prior to his collegiate career, Renouf spent two seasons with the Youngstown Phantoms of the United States Hockey League (USHL). During the 2011–12 season, Renouf recorded one goal and 14 assists in 58 games, finishing second on the team in scoring by a defenceman. During the 2012–13 season, he recorded ten goals and 18 assists in 57 games, and helped lead the Phantoms to the Eastern Conference Finals, where they lost to eventual Clark Cup champions Dubuque Fighting Saints.

College 
Renouf began his collegiate career for the Maine Black Bears during the 2013–14 season. Renouf appeared in 34 games during his freshman season, where he recorded one goal and 10 assists for 11 points, and ranked second on the team in scoring by a defenceman. During the 2014–15 season, Renouf appeared in all 39 games his sophomore season, where he recorded three goals and nine assists. During the 2015–16 season, he recorded six goals and nine assists in 38 games, and led the team in scoring by a defenceman.

Professional

On March 10, 2016, Renouf was signed to a two-year, entry-level contract by the Detroit Red Wings. Following the conclusion of his collegiate career, Renouf joined the Grand Rapids Griffins during the 2015–16 season, where he recorded one assist in six games.

On March 26, 2017, Renouf was recalled by the Red Wings. Prior to being recalled, Renouf recorded three goals and 12 assists in 58 games with the Griffins. He made his NHL debut for the Red Wings the following night in a game against the Carolina Hurricanes, where he recorded one shot on goal and three hits in 13:35 time on ice. On March 28, he was returned to the Griffins.

At the conclusion of his entry-level contract, Renouf was not tendered a qualifying offer by the Red Wings, allowing him to depart as a free agent. On July 2, 2018, Renouf signed a one-year, two-way contract with the Carolina Hurricanes. After attending the Hurricanes training camp, Renouf was assigned for the duration of the 2018–19 season to the AHL to play with affiliate, the Charlotte Checkers. Used in a top-four role on the blueline, Renouf added 2 goals and 22 points in 74 regular season games for the league's best Checkers. He added 3 points in 12 playoff games to help Charlotte claim the Calder Cup, his second AHL championship in two years. 

On July 1, 2019, the Colorado Avalanche signed Renouf to a two-year, two-way $1.4 million contract. 

On July 29, 2021, Renouf returned to his original club, the Detroit Red Wings, by agreeing to a one-year, two-way contract.

On July 13, 2022, Renouf signed a two-year, two-way contract with the Boston Bruins.

Career statistics

Awards and honours

References

External links
 

1994 births
Living people
Boston Bruins players
Canadian ice hockey defencemen
Charlotte Checkers (2010–) players
Colorado Avalanche players
Colorado Eagles players
Detroit Red Wings players
Grand Rapids Griffins players
Ice hockey people from Ontario
Maine Black Bears men's ice hockey players
People from Pickering, Ontario
Providence Bruins players
Undrafted National Hockey League players
Youngstown Phantoms players